Jeanne Elizabeth Crain (May 25, 1925 – December 14, 2003) was an American actress. She was nominated for an Academy Award for Best Actress for her title role in Pinky (1949). She also starred in the films In the Meantime, Darling (1944), State Fair (1945), Leave Her to Heaven (1945), Centennial Summer (1946), Margie (1946), Apartment for Peggy (1948), A Letter to Three Wives (1949), Cheaper by the Dozen (1950), People Will Talk (1951), Man Without a Star (1955), Gentlemen Marry Brunettes (1955), The Fastest Gun Alive (1956), and The Joker Is Wild (1957).

Early life
Crain was born in Barstow, California, to George A. Crain, a schoolteacher, and Loretta Carr, who were Irish Catholics. By 1930, they were living in Inglewood, California at 822 S. Walnut Avenue. When her parents divorced in 1934, the family of three moved to 5817 Van Ness Ave in Los Angeles.

An excellent ice skater, Crain first attracted attention when she was crowned Miss Pan-Pacific at the Pan-Pacific Auditorium in Los Angeles. Later, while still in high school, she was asked to take a screen test with Orson Welles, but she did not get the part. After high school, she enrolled at UCLA to study drama. In 1943, at age 18, she appeared in a bit part in the film The Gang's All Here.

Career

20th Century Fox

The Gang's All Here was produced by 20th Century Fox. Fox then cast Crain in her first sizable role, in the romantic drama Home in Indiana (1944) with Walter Brennan, in which she played the love interest of Lon McCallister's character. The film, shot in Technicolor, was popular at the box office and established Crain as a film name.

A delighted Darryl F Zanuck, head of Fox, gave Crain top billing in In the Meantime, Darling (1944), directed by Otto Preminger, where she played a war bride. Her acting was critically panned, but she gained nationwide attention. It resulted in her landing the lead role in The Shocking Miss Pilgrim in October 1944, a musical film which was eventually made with Betty Grable as the star.

Crain first received critical acclaim when she starred in Winged Victory (1944). She co-starred in 1945 with Dana Andrews in the musical film State Fair, where Louanne Hogan dubbed Crain's singing. After that, Crain often had singing parts in films, and they were invariably dubbed, usually by Hogan.

State Fair was a hit, as was Leave Her to Heaven (1945), in which Crain played the "good" sister of her "bad" sibling, played by Gene Tierney, both of whom are in love with Cornel Wilde's character. Crain became established as one of Fox's bigger stars—so much so that Zanuck refused to let her play the comparatively small part of Clementine in My Darling Clementine (1946).

Crain and Wilde were reunited in Centennial Summer (1946), directed by Preminger, Fox's attempt to match the success of Meet Me in St. Louis (1944). More popular was Margie (1946), which displayed her ice skating ability, and where she and Conrad Janis danced around the ice rink as her boyfriend, played by Alan Young, slipped and stumbled after them.

She made two films in 1948: You Were Meant for Me, a musical with Dan Dailey that may have included Marilyn Monroe's first film appearance; and Apartment for Peggy, with William Holden.

Career peak
In 1949, Crain was in three films. A Letter to Three Wives (1949), where she was top-billed, was a solid box-office hit that won Joseph L. Mankiewicz two Oscars and is considered a classic. The Fan, directed by Preminger and based on Lady Windermere's Fan by Oscar Wilde, was poorly received. Pinky brought Crain a nomination for the Academy Award for Best Actress, and was one of the year's more popular films; however, it was controversial as it told the story of a light-skinned African American woman who passed for white in the Northern United States. Although Lena Horne and other black actresses were considered, producer Darryl F. Zanuck chose to cast a white actress for fear of racial backlash.

Crain had another big success when she starred with Myrna Loy and Clifton Webb in the 1950 biographical film Cheaper by the Dozen, although hers was more of a supporting role. She had a cameo as herself in I'll Get By (1951) and starred in Take Care of My Little Girl (1951), a mildly popular drama about snobbery in college sororities.

Next, Crain paired with Cary Grant in the Joseph L. Mankiewicz film of the offbeat comedy/drama People Will Talk (1951). Despite Crain's intense campaigning for the female lead, Anne Baxter was initially cast in the part; but when she had to forfeit due to pregnancy, Crain got the role after all.

Shortly after, Crain starred in Charles Brackett's production The Model and the Marriage Broker (1951). Cast in May 1951, she was Brackett's first choice. She was reunited with Loy for Belles on Their Toes (1952), the sequel to Cheaper by the Dozen, and got top billing this time.

While still at 20th Century Fox, Crain played a young wife losing her mind amid high-seas intrigue in Dangerous Crossing (1953), co-starring Michael Rennie. She starred in Vicki (1953), a remake of I Wake Up Screaming; and Fox tried her in a Western, City of Bad Men (1954). Both films performed only mildly at the box office, and Crain left the studio.

Universal
Crain made Duel in the Jungle (1954) in Britain and then Man Without a Star (1955), a Western with Kirk Douglas at Universal, where she played the lead female role of a hard-nosed ranch-owner.

She showed her dancing skills in 1955's Gentlemen Marry Brunettes, a quasi-sequel to Gentlemen Prefer Blondes based on Anita Loos' novel and co-starring Jane Russell. The film was shot partly in Paris and was released in France as A Paris Pour les Quatre (To Paris for the Four), and in Belgium as Cevieren Te Parijs. Later in the 1950s, Crain, Russell, and another actress formed a short-lived singing and dancing lounge act on the Las Vegas Strip.

Crain made the Western comedy The Second Greatest Sex (1956), then starred with Glenn Ford, Russ Tamblyn, and Broderick Crawford in The Fastest Gun Alive directed by Russell Rouse. It was a big hit. At Universal, she starred with Jeff Chandler in the thriller The Tattered Dress (1957), then played a socialite who helps floundering singer and comedian Joe E. Lewis (Frank Sinatra) redeem himself in The Joker Is Wild (1957).

At this time, Crain began working in television, playing Daisy in a 1958 adaptation of The Great Gatsby and Rose in 1959's all-star production of Meet Me in St. Louis alongside Myrna Loy, Walter Pidgeon, Jane Powell, Ed Wynn, and top billed Tab Hunter.

Later career
Crain appeared in fewer films in the 1960s as she entered semiretirement. She starred as Nefertiti in the Italian production of Nefertiti, Queen of the Nile (1961) with Edmund Purdom and Vincent Price; and in Madison Avenue (1962) with Dana Andrews and Eleanor Parker. During this period, Crain appeared—for the second time—as a mystery guest on What's My Line?, and made guest appearances on the Riverboat and Burke's Law.

She again co-starred with Dana Andrews in Hot Rods To Hell (1967). Her last films were The Night God Screamed (1971) and Skyjacked (1972) with Charlton Heston.

Personal life

At the height of her stardom in the late 1940s and early 1950s, Crain was known as "Hollywood's Number One party girl", and she was quoted as saying she was invited to at least 200 parties a year.

Against her mother's wishes, on December 31, 1945, Crain married Paul Brinkman, a former contract player at RKO Pictures who was credited as Paul Brooks. He later became a top executive with an arms manufacturing company. They had seven children.

The marriage was rocky. In the mid-1950s, Crain obtained an interlocutory divorce decree. Each claimed the other was unfaithful, and she alleged he was abusive. However, they reconciled on December 31, 1956.

In the early 1960s, she was one of many conservative actors who spent their time promoting the Republican Party.

Crain and her husband remained married, although they lived separately in Santa Barbara until Brinkman's death in October 2003.

Crain died two months later from a heart attack. Her funeral mass was held at the Old Santa Barbara Mission. She is buried in the Brinkman family plot at Santa Barbara Cemetery.

Legacy
Crain's career is documented in the Jeanne Crain Collection of memorabilia assembled by Charles J. Finlay, a longtime 20th Century Fox publicist, which resides at the Cinema Archives at Wesleyan University in Middletown, Connecticut.
Her son Paul F. Brinkman Jr., a television executive, is most known for his work on the television series JAG.

Filmography

Film

Television

Radio performances

Awards and nominations

Sources
 Girl Next Door: The Life and Career of Jeanne Crain by Rupert Alistair CreateSpace

References

External links

 

 jeannecrain.org, a Jeanne Crain tribute website by Crain's granddaughter Bret Crain Csupo
 Photographs and literature
 

1925 births
2003 deaths
20th-century American actresses
Actresses from Los Angeles
American film actresses
American radio actresses
American television actresses
People from Barstow, California
Actresses from Santa Barbara, California
American people of Irish descent
20th Century Studios contract players
California Republicans
Catholics from California
Burials at Santa Barbara Cemetery